Xingfu Temple is a Buddhist temple located at the foot of Mount Yu in Changshu, Jiangsu, China.

History
The temple was first construction as "Dabei Temple" or "Temple of Great Compassion" between 494 and 502 by prefectural governor Ni Deguang, under the Southern Qi dynasty (479–502).

It was largely extended  in 539 and renamed "Fushou Temple" or "Temple of Blessing and Longevity", during the reign of Emperor Wu of Liang dynasty (502–557). It was also called "Poshan Temple" because it sits along the Polong Stream.

In 868, in the 9th year of Xiantong period in the Tang dynasty (618–907), Emperor Yizong inscribed plaque with Chinese characters "Xingfu Chan Temple" to the temple.

After the establishment of the Communist State in 1949, the local government renovated and refurbished Xingfu Temple several times. A renovation and rebuilding to the main building began in 1981 and were completed in 1985. Xingfu Temple has been designated as a National Key Buddhist Temple in Han Chinese Area by the State Council of China in 1983.

Architecture
The existing main buildings include Shanmen, Mahavira Hall, Hall of Four Heavenly Kings, Hall of Guanyin, Bell tower, Drum tower, Hall of Guru, Dharma Hall, Huayan Pagoda, and Pagoda of Xingfu Temple.

Culture
Chang Jian,, a Tang dynasty poet lived in the mid-8th century, eulogized a poem "Writing on the wall of a hall at Poshan Temple" after visiting the temple. The poem was inscribed to the Three Hundred Tang Poems by Qing dynasty scholar Sun Zhu. It is selected in middle school textbook.

References

External links
 

Buddhist temples in Suzhou
Buildings and structures in Suzhou
Tourist attractions in Suzhou
1985 establishments in China
20th-century Buddhist temples
Religious buildings and structures completed in 1985